The Errea House is a historic house located at 311 S. Green St. in Tehachapi, California. The house is the only surviving building from the settlement of Tehichipa, the first town in the Tehachapi area. Tehichipa was founded in 1869, and the house was built sometime between 1870 and 1875. In 1876, the Southern Pacific Railroad bypassed Tehichipa, instead establishing a new townsite at Tehachapi Summit, which later became Tehachapi. The railroad's action led to the decline of Tehichipa's shipping industry, and the town's residents gradually moved to Tehachapi. The Errea House was moved to Tehachapi as well around 1900. No buildings from the original settlement survive at the site of Tehichipa, and the Errea House is the only building remaining from the town. The Errea House is now located across from the Tehachapi Museum, where it helps illustrate the city's early history.

The Errea House was added to the National Register of Historic Places on July 29, 1997.

See also

References

External links
Tehachapi Museum: Errea House

Houses in Kern County, California
Historic house museums in California
Museums in Kern County, California
National Register of Historic Places in Kern County, California
Houses on the National Register of Historic Places in California
Tehachapi Mountains
Victorian architecture in California